The Lake Wales Historic Residential District is a U.S. historic district (designated as such on August 8, 1997) located in Lake Wales, Florida. The district is bounded by the Seaboard Airline RR grade, CSX RR tracks, East Polk Avenue, South and North Lake Shore Boulevards. It contains 206 historic buildings.

References

External links
 Polk County listings at National Register of Historic Places

Lake Wales, Florida
National Register of Historic Places in Polk County, Florida
Historic districts on the National Register of Historic Places in Florida